In mathematical finite group theory, the Gorenstein–Harada theorem, proved by  in a 464-page paper, classifies the simple finite groups of sectional 2-rank at most 4. It is part of the classification of finite simple groups.

Finite simple groups of section 2 that rank at least 5, have Sylow 2-subgroups with a self-centralizing normal subgroup of rank at least 3, which implies that they have to be of either component type or of characteristic 2 type. Therefore, the Gorenstein–Harada theorem splits the problem of classifying finite simple groups into these two sub-cases.

References

Theorems about finite groups